The New Democratic Macau Association is a political party in the Chinese Special Administrative Region of Macau created from Au Kam Sans split from the New Macau Association in 2016. In the 2017 legislative election, the New Democratic Macau Association won 6.59 percent of the popular vote and 1 of the 14 popularly elected seats.

Elected members
 Au Kam San, 2016–present
 António Ng Kuok Cheong, 2017–present

References

Political parties in Macau
Political parties established in 2017